Emile Kellogg Boisot (February 26, 1859 – February 1, 1941) was President of the First Trust and Savings Bank of Chicago, Illinois. He was vice president of the Chicago First National Bank and director of a number of corporations.

Early life
Emile Kellogg Boisot was born in Dubuque, Iowa on February 26, 1859. He was the son of Louis Daniel Boisot (1823-1900) and Albertina Bush (1825-1889). He is a direct descendant of Jean-Baptiste Boisot who was a French abbot, bibliophile, and scholar.

He was educated in the public and high schools of Dubuque, Iowa. His brother, Louis Boisot, Jr.(1856-1933), was a successful lawyer and vice-president of the First Trust and Savings Bank of Chicago. Louis wrote two books, “By-laws of Private Corporations” in 1892 and “Treatise on Mechanics' Liens” in 1897.

Marriage and children

On November 4, 1891, Boisot married Lilly R. Moseman (1860-1939) in Chicago, Illinois. She had been married before to a George Moseman. The Boisots had three children.

Professional life

In 1875, Boisot was employed by the German Bank at Dubuque, where he remained for three years.

First National Bank

In 1878, Boisot moved to Chicago, Illinois where he entered the bond department of the First National Bank. The First National Bank of Chicago became the First Chicago Bank, which merged into Bank One Corporation and later the Chase Bank.

On January 1, 1897, Boisot was promoted manager of the Foreign Exchange and Bond Department at the First National Bank of Chicago. In 1904, he was appointed vice president and manager of the bank. He was director of three other Chicago banks and trustee of Rollins College. He was a member of the Chicago Stock Exchange and the Republican Party (United States).

In December 1915, Boisot was elected president of the First Trust and Savings Bank of Chicago that provided savings accounts to individual customers. First Trust and Savings Bank merged with the Union Trust Company in 1928 to become the First Union Trust and Savings Bank.

Death
On February 1, 1941, Boisot died at his home in Pasadena, California, after a short illness. He was 81 years old. Services were held at the Wee Kirk o' the Heather chapel at the  Forest Lawn Memorial Park (Glendale), California.

References

1859 births
1941 deaths
American bankers
People from Iowa